Samuel Delucenna Ingham (September 16, 1779 – June 5, 1860) was a state legislator, judge, U.S. Representative and served as U.S. Treasury Secretary under President Andrew Jackson.

Early life and education
Ingham was born near New Hope, Pennsylvania. His parents were Dr. Jonathan Ingham, "a famous physician from Philadelphia," and his wife, the former Ann Welding.

After a pursuit of classical studies, he was an apprentice to a paper maker along Pennypack Creek, not far from Philadelphia.

Manufacturer
After completing his apprenticeship, Ingham became the manager of a paper mill at Bloomfield, New Jersey.  It was while here he met Rebecca Dodd, whom he married in 1800.  They had five children.

Also in 1800 Ingham returned to Pennsylvania and established a paper mill on his mother's farm (his father having died in 1793) that would be his main source of employment in the coming years.

Political career

He was a member of the Pennsylvania House of Representatives from 1806 to 1808. Then, Ingham was appointed Justice of the Peace by the Governor of Pennsylvania.

He was a member of the United States House of Representatives from 1813 to July 6, 1818. He easily trounced his Federalist opponents in the first two elections and had no opposition at all in 1816. He resigned from Congress in 1818 because of his wife's ill health.  He was appointed the Prothonotary (Chief Clerk, Notary and Registrar of the Court) of the Court of Common Pleas of Bucks County, Pennsylvania after leaving Congress. In 1819 Rebecca Dodd Ingham died.

Ingham served as Secretary of the Commonwealth of Pennsylvania from 1819 to 1820.

In 1822 Ingham married Deborah Hall of Salem, New Jersey.  They would become the parents of three children.

Also in 1822 Ingham was elected to Congress where he would serve until 1829.

During the 13th Congress he was chair of the United States House Committee on Pensions and Revolutionary War Claims.  During the 14th, 15th, 19th and 20th Congresses, he was chair of the House Committee on the Post Office and Post Roads, and he was chair of the House Committee on Expenditures in the Post Office Department during the 15th Congress.

Secretary of the Treasury
Ingham served as the ninth Secretary of the US Treasury from March 6, 1829, to June 21, 1831.

The Second Bank of the United States, viewed by Jackson and much of the nation as an unconstitutional and dangerous monopoly, was Ingham's primary concern as Secretary of the Treasury. Jackson mistrusted the Second Bank of the United States and all other banks.

Jackson thought that there should be no paper currency in circulation but only coins and that the US Constitution was designed to expel paper currency from the monetary system. Ingham believed in the Second Bank and attempted to resolve conflicts between Jackson, who wanted it destroyed, and the Bank's president, Nicholas Biddle.

Despite being unable to reach any resolution between Jackson and Biddle, Ingham left office over an unrelated incident, which stemmed from his involvement in the social ostracism of Peggy Eaton, the wife of Secretary of War John H. Eaton, by a group of Cabinet members and their wives. It was led by Floride Calhoun, the wife of Vice President John C. Calhoun and became known as the Petticoat affair. Eaton challenged Ingham to a duel, which Ingham did not accept. On June 20, 1831, Eaton recruited a posse to search for Ingham, and Ingham responded by arming himself and requesting Jackson's help. With no help forthcoming from the president, Ingham fled to Baltimore the following morning and then to Bucks County, thus likely saving his life.

Societies
During the 1820s, Ingham was a member of the prestigious Columbian Institute for the Promotion of Arts and Sciences, which counted among its members two eventual presidents, Andrew Jackson and John Quincy Adams, and many other prominent men of the day, including well-known representatives of the military, government service, medical, and other professions. In 1840, Ingham was elected as a member to the American Philosophical Society.

Later life
After resigning as Secretary of the Treasury, Ingham resumed the manufacture of paper, and engaged in the development of anthracite coal fields.  He was involved with the organization of the Beaver Meadow Railroad Company (e. 1830<ref
 name=Koehler>
</ref>), of which he was then made president for a time.<ref
 name=Dingham>
</ref>  He was connected with the organization of the Hazleton Coal Company.  He worked to promote canals such at the Lehigh Navigation and the Delaware Canal.  He moved to Trenton, New Jersey, in 1849, where he worked with that city's Mechanics Bank.

Ingham died in Trenton, New Jersey, and is interred in the Solebury Presbyterian Churchyard, Solebury, Pennsylvania.  Ingham County, Michigan, one of several Cabinet counties named for members of Jackson's administration, is named in Ingham's honor.

Notes

References

Further reading

External links

Finding aid to the Samuel D. Ingham correspondence at the University of Pennsylvania Libraries

|-

|-

|-

|-

|-

1779 births
1860 deaths
19th-century American politicians
United States Secretaries of the Treasury
Democratic Party members of the Pennsylvania House of Representatives
Papermakers
People from Bucks County, Pennsylvania
Politicians from Trenton, New Jersey
Secretaries of the Commonwealth of Pennsylvania
Jackson administration cabinet members
Burials in Pennsylvania
Democratic-Republican Party members of the United States House of Representatives from Pennsylvania